USS Patricia was a transatlantic liner that was launched in Germany in 1899 and spent most of her career with Hamburg America Line (HAPAG). She was the last to be built of a class of four HAPAG sister ships that came from shipyards in the United Kingdom and Germany between 1896 and 1899.

In 1919, HAPAG surrendered Patricia to the United States as part of Germany's World War I reparations to the Allies, and she was used to repatriate American Expeditionary Forces troops from Europe.

Later, in 1919, she was transferred from the US government to the UK Shipping Controller. She was scrapped in England in 1921.

Building
Patricia was the last to be built of HAPAG's four P-class ocean liners, all of which were completed in the second half of the 1890s. Harland and Wolff launched the first of them, in 1896.

AG Vulcan Stettin launched Patricia on 20 February 1899 and completed her that May. She had berths for 162 passengers in first class, 184 in second class and 2,143 in third class.

Patricia had twin propellers, each driven by a four-cylinder quadruple-expansion steam engine.

HAPAG registered Patricia in Hamburg. Her code letters were RLGQ.

German service
In March 1899 HAPAG announced that the regular route for Patricia and her three sisters would be Hamburg – Cherbourg – Plymouth – New York. HAPAG also announced a reduction in its transatlantic fares. On Patricia and her sisters the rate for a first class cabin was reduced from $65 to $50, and that for a second class cabin was reduced from $47.50 to $38.

On 7 May 1899 Patricia began her maiden voyage from Hamburg via Boulogne to New York. She reached New York on 19 May, and was opened for public inspection at Hoboken Terminal, New Jersey on 25 May.

In the Elbe on 2 January 1910 Patricia rammed the lightvessel Elbe V, sinking her. Afterwards Patricia was refitted as a two-class ship. First class was abolished, and second class berths were increased to 408.

By 1913 Patricia was equipped for wireless telegraphy. Her call sign was DDP.

On 27 November 1913 Patricia began what became her last voyage from Hamburg to New York. On 12 January 1914 the German government requisitioned her as a troop ship to Tsingtao on the coast of China.

US service

On 26 March 1919, HAPAG surrendered Patricia to the United States Government. On 28 March at Cowes, Isle of Wight she was commissioned into the United States Navy, but she was not given a pennant number. Lt Cdr CC Windsor, United StatesNRF, was appointed to command her.

On 30 March 1919 Patricia left Brest, France carrying members of the American Expeditionary Forces home to New York. This was the first of four voyages that Patricia made from France to the USA, in which she repatriated a total of 8,865 servicemen.

In one voyage in April 1919 Patricia brought home from Brest to Boston almost 3,000 troops of the 26th Division, including the 102nd and 103rd machine gun battalions. On 15 April 1919, while Patricia was in mid-Atlantic, Julius Fischer, a HAPAG agent, locked himself in one of her state rooms and set fire to it by causing an electrical short-circuit. Members of her crew broke down the door, put out the fire and arrested Fischer. Other HAPAG agents said that Fischer was mentally unwell at the time. Patricia reached Boston on 17 April.

On 4 June 1919 Patricia reached Hoboken carrying 2,847 members of the 36th Infantry Division. They included 150 Native American scouts.

Graf Waldersee reported  of water in her engine room, and Redondo shipped water in her forward hold. Patricia received Graf Waldersees wireless distress signal and came to assist.

Patricia took off Graf Waldersees passengers and half of her crew and then took the damaged liner in tow. Late on the morning of 12 June Graf Waldersees crew beached her on a sandbar on Long Island. Graf Waldersee was refloated on the afternoon of 14 June and four tugs towed her to Brooklyn Navy Yard.

UK service
On 6 September 1919 it was announced that as soon as the United States Department of War had no further use for ships seized from German ports under the Treaty of Versailles, they would be returned to the Inter-Allied Council. The council would decide whether to return the ships to their German owners or redistribute them among the Allies.

On 18 September 1919 Patricia was decommissioned from the US Navy and transferred to the UK Shipping Controller, which appointed Ellerman's Wilson Line to manage her. In November 1921 she arrived at Blyth, Northumberland to be scrapped.

References

External links
 – photograph of Julius Fischer under arrest in April 1919

1899 ships
Maritime incidents in 1910
Maritime incidents in 1919
Ocean liners
Passenger ships of Germany
Passenger ships of the United Kingdom
Ships built in Hamburg
Ships of the Hamburg America Line
Steamships of Germany
Steamships of the United Kingdom
Steamships of the United States
Troop ships of Germany
Troop ships of the United States